Lyubov Shmatko (born 25 October 1993) is a Ukrainian footballer, who plays as a defender for Ankara BB Fomget GSK in the Turkish Women's Super League, and has appeared for the Ukraine women's national team.

Club career 
In the beginning of March 2022, Shmatko moved to Turkey and joined the Ankara-based club Fomget Gençlik ve Spor to play in the second half of the 2021-22 Turkish Women's Football Super League.

International career 
Shmatko has been capped for the Ukraine national team, appearing for the team during the 2019 FIFA Women's World Cup qualifying cycle.

References

External links 
 
 
 

1993 births
Living people
Sportspeople from Mykolaiv Oblast
Ukrainian women's footballers
Women's association football defenders
WFC Lehenda-ShVSM Chernihiv players
Ukraine women's international footballers
Ukrainian expatriate women's footballers
Ukrainian expatriate sportspeople in Belarus
Expatriate women's footballers in Belarus
FC Minsk (women) players
Ukrainian expatriate sportspeople in Turkey
Expatriate women's footballers in Turkey
Turkish Women's Football Super League players
Fomget Gençlik ve Spor players